The Peace of Prague, signed on 30 May 1635, ended Saxony's participation in the Thirty Years War. Other German princes subsequently joined the treaty and although the Thirty Years War continued, it is generally agreed Prague ended it as a war of religion within the Holy Roman Empire. Thereafter, the conflict was largely driven by foreign powers, including Spain, Sweden, and France.

Some scholars regard the treaty merely as a step towards the terms of the 1648 Peace of Westphalia, but others recognise it as an important treaty in its own right that marked the boundaries between two historical eras. European historians generally pay more attention to the Peace of Prague than their non-European colleagues, who are more focused on Westphalia.

Background

The Thirty Years' War began in 1618 when Frederick, the Protestant ruler of the Palatinate, accepted the crown of Bohemia. Many Germans remained neutral and viewed it as an inheritance dispute. With Bavarian support, Emperor Ferdinand quickly suppressed the Bohemian Revolt. Troops under Maximilian I, Elector of Bavaria invaded the Palatinate in 1622 and sent Frederick into exile. However, depriving a hereditary prince of his lands changed both the nature and the extent of the war.  

Christian IV of Denmark invaded Northern Germany in support of his fellow Protestants until he was defeated and forced to withdraw in 1629. Success led Ferdinand to pass the Edict of Restitution, which required any property transferred since 1552 to be restored to its original owner, which was in nearly every case the Catholic Church. By effectively undoing the 1555 Peace of Augsburg, the edict forced moderate Protestants like John George of Saxony and George William of Brandenburg into opposition. That increased after 1627 by having a large Imperial army based on their lands, whose rarely-paid troops simply took what they wanted.  

Conflicts in 17th-century Europe often drew in foreign participants because of the rivalry between the Bourbon kings of France and their Habsburg rivals in Spain and the Holy Roman Empire. Habsburg territories in the Spanish Netherlands, the Franche-Comté and the Pyrenees blocked the expnsion of France and made it vulnerable to invasion. As a result, the Catholic Bourbons supported their Habsburg opponents, irrespective of religion, including the Ottomans, the Dutch and the Danishs-Norwegians.

In 1630, Gustavus Adolphus of Sweden invaded Pomerania with money from France and support from Saxony and Brandenburg-Prussia. After his death at the Battle of Lützen (1632), Sweden formed the Heilbronn League. Composed of smaller Protestant states and funded by France, the League won a series of victories until it was defeated at Nördlingen in 1634.  

That re-established a military balance and highlighted differences between the Heilbronn members. Sweden sought to preserve its grip on the lucrative Baltic trade and to retain its post-1630 acquisition of Swedish Pomerania. To strengthen its borders in the Rhineland and the Low Countries, France supported the Dutch and Swedish competitors in the Baltic and Maximilian of Bavaria, a leader of the anti-Swedish Catholic League. The German allies wanted to restore the territorial position of 1618, which implied reversing French and Swedish gains.

After 1632, Ferdinand accepted Catholicism could not be re-imposed by force and opened discussions on amending the Edict of Restitution in February 1633, eighteen months before Nördlingen. The execution of Imperial Commander Albrecht von Wallenstein in February 1634 removed a major obstacle since he had become an independent agent. With the Lutheran states of Denmark-Norway and Hesse-Darmstadt acting as mediators, the two parties agreed a preliminary draft in November 1634, known as the Pirnaer Noteln. Although subject to many corrections and revisions, that was the basis of the 1635 agreement.

Terms
The treaty was a bilateral agreement between Ferdinand and John George, and other states joined later. Negotiations took eight days and were held in Prague Castle, the site of the Defenestrations of Prague, which had begun the war in 1618. Its terms included the following;
 
 The Edict of Restitution was effectively revoked, and the date for returning properties was established as 12 November 1627. However, under the Reservatum ecclesiasticum, Protestant administrators of formally Catholic prince-bishoprics and imperial abbeys were excluded from the Imperial Diet.

 Formal alliances between states within the Empire or with outside powers were prohibited, which  led to dissolution of the Catholic and Heilbronn Leagues.

 In principle, the armies of the various states were unified into the Army of the Holy Roman Empire, but that proved almost impossible to enforce;

 A general amnesty was granted to those who had fought against Imperial troops, apart from descendants of former "Winter King" Frederick V of the Palatinate (1596–1632).

Aftermath

Accessions 
Many other states and rulers subsequently acceded to the treaty, including:
 31 August 1635: George, Duke of Brunswick-Calenberg – Principality of Calenberg and Duchy of Brunswick-Lüneburg
 Electorate of Brandenburg
 Electorate of Mainz
 Ferdinand of Bavaria – Electorate of Cologne, Prince-Bishopric of Münster (the Chapter of Münster signed as a separate party), and Prince-Bishopric of Paderborn
 Franz von Hatzfeld – Prince-Bishopric of Bamberg
 George II, Landgrave of Hesse-Darmstadt – Landgraviate of Hesse-Darmstadt
Saxe-Weimar
Saxe-Gotha
Duchy of Mecklenburg-Schwerin
The princes of Anhalt
 Countess Katharine of Lippe-Detmold
 Count of Zweibrücken-Hanau
 Hanseatic League cities such as the Free City of Hamburg and the Free City of Bremen
 Several imperial cities such as
Erfurt (which never achieved imperial city status)
Free City of Frankfurt
Imperial City of Memmingen
Free Imperial City of Nuremberg
Free Imperial City of Ulm
Electorate of Bavaria

Some exceptions:
 Calvinist William V, Landgrave of Hesse-Kassel initially also acceded to the Peace of Prague but in 1636 concluded an alliance with France instead, which earned him an imperial ban.
 The Imperial City of Strasbourg did not accede to the treaty.
 The Duchy of Württemberg was explicitly excluded from the treaty.

Imperial restoration and territorial changes 

Some of the states that later acceded to the Peace of Prague received minor concessions: Brandenburg-Prussia was confirmed as holder of Farther Pomerania, previously a possession of the last Duke Bogislaw XIV.

In 1623, Saxony occupied the Bohemian crown lands of Lower and Upper Lusatia in return for its support during the Bohemian Revolt. Under the Traditionsrezess annex of 1636, Ferdinand ceded both territories in perpetuity, plus the towns of Jüterbog, Dahme and Burg Querfurt. John George also received the Archbishopric of Magdeburg and Halberstadt, after agreeing not to secularise them; these were transferred to Brandenburg-Prussia in 1648.

While Ferdinand continued the Counter-Reformation in his own lands, it is generally agreed the Peace of Prague ended it as an internal religious conflict and re-established the principle of cuius regio, eius religio. By renouncing their right to create alliances and handing over control of armed forces, the Imperial estates, in return, acknowledged the supremacy of the Emperor.

Continuation of wars 
However, those principles were not universally followed and hostilities continued, including the Hessian War (1567–1648), a bitter religious war of succession between Hesse-Darmstadt and Hesse-Kassel, as well as foreign intervention. On 19 May 1635, France declared war on Spain. While his brother William joined the Peace with the duchy of Saxe-Weimar, Bernard of Saxe-Weimar and his army were employed by France against Spanish possessions in Lorraine and in the Rhineland. In 1642, Sweden fought again fought again at Breitenfeld, won decisively and overran Saxony. That prompted many German states to shift towards neutrality and to negiotate independently from the Emperor. The different war parties fought on in the hope of improving their position, and peace was not finally achieved until the Peace of Westphalia in 1648.

Notes

References

Sources

External links

Scan of the Imperial-Saxon treaty at IEG Mainz, 81 pages

1635 in Europe
Prague (1635)
Prague (1635)
Prague (1635)
1635 treaties
Treaties of the Electorate of Saxony
Treaties of the Electorate of Bavaria
1635 in the Holy Roman Empire
17th century in Saxony
Ferdinand II, Holy Roman Emperor